The 1994 NHL Supplemental Draft was the ninth and final NHL Supplemental Draft. It was held on June 28, 1994. It was limited to the ten teams that missed the 1994 Stanley Cup playoffs.

Selections

See also
1994 NHL Entry Draft
1994–95 NHL season
List of NHL players

References

External links
 1994 NHL Supplemental Draft player stats at The Internet Hockey Database

1994
Draft